Doğanbey is the name of several localities in Turkey:

 Doğanbey, Beyşehir, a township with its own municipality in Beyşehir, Konya Province
 Doğanbey, Karaçoban
 Doğanbey, Seferihisar, a coastal township with its own municipality in Seferihisar, İzmir Province
 Doğanbey, Söke, a village in Söke, Aydın Province
 Doğanbey, Yapraklı

Furthermore, in association with Doğanbey, Seferihisar, are the following geographical names:

 Doğanbey Cape (anciently Makria)
 Doğanbey Island (anciently Makris)